Christopher Dale Pratt, CBE, was the chairman and executive director of Cathay Pacific Airways Limited and Swire Pacific Limited.

Background 
Christopher Dale Pratt joined the John Swire & Sons Limited in 1978 and had worked with the group in Hong Kong, as well as Australia and Papua New Guinea. He was the chairman and executive director of Cathay Pacific and Swire Pacific, and had held the position from 1 February 2006; following the sudden resignation of David Turnbull, less than a year after he succeeded James W. J. Hughes-Hallett. Pratt was also the chairman of Hong Kong Aircraft Engineering Company Limited (HAECO), John Swire & Sons (H.K.) Limited, Swire Beverages Limited and Swire Properties Limited, and a director of Air China Limited and The Hongkong and Shanghai Banking Corporation Limited. Pratt retired from the Swire group in March 2014.

Pratt served as the executive director of the Swire Pacific's Trading and Industrial Division between 2000 and 2005. In addition, he served as a director of Steamships Trading Company Limited from 1995 and became the chairman in 2000, and continued to serve until his retirement from the company on 27 February 2006.

Education 
Pratt has an honours degree in modern history from the University of Oxford.

Awards and honours 
Pratt is awarded the Commander of the Order of the British Empire (CBE) (Civil Division) in the 2000 New Year Honours for his services to the community in Papua New Guinea.

See also 

 Cathay Pacific
 Swire Group

References

External links
 Cathay Pacific Airways
 Swire Group
 Swire Pacific
 Bloomberg via Youtube: Swire & China - An Interview with Christopher Pratt Aug 6 2009 23:10ET

Cathay Pacific
Commanders of the Order of the British Empire
Place of birth missing (living people)
Living people
Alumni of the University of Oxford
1956 births